The Royal Order of Charles XIII is a Swedish order of merit, founded by King Charles XIII in 1811.

Membership
The Lord and Master of the Order is the King of Sweden, currently King Carl XVI Gustaf.  Membership of the order can only be conferred on Freemasons of the Protestant faith. The membership of the order comprises:

Thirty lay members and never more than seven non-Swedish members, each holding the XI (highest) degree of the Swedish Rite of Freemasonry, i.e. either regional heads or national heads.
Three clerical members, invariably priests or bishops of the Church of Sweden.
All princes of the Royal House of Sweden are members from birth, but do not wear the insignia unless they are Knight and Commander of the Red Cross of the Swedish Order of Freemasons. (Hence the insignia is not worn by the King nor the Duke of Värmland, who are both Knights of the Order from birth).
Foreign princes of Blood Royal may be admitted as honorary members, if they are also senior Freemasons, whether of the Swedish Order or another; they are full members of the Order, but do not count towards its membership limits; Prince Edward, Duke of Kent (United Kingdom) was admitted to the Order on 6 November 2000.

There can never be more than 33 persons who are members at the same time. (Men of royal blood are automatically members, and do not count as part of the 33 allotted slots).

Insignia and regalia
The insignia consists of a red St George cross, in the centre a white globe with the monogram of the institutor, two opposite letters C surrounding XIII, in gold. On the reverse the globe has the letter B in gold in an equilateral black and gold edged triangle. The cross is surmounted by a closed golden crown. The insignia is worn around the neck in a red ribbon. There is also red breast red cross: the insignia hence is the same as a Commander 1st Class and recipients rank after the Commanders 1st Class of the Swedish Royal Orders. 

The order uses a habit, introduced 1822, and new knights are dubbed.

See also
Orders, decorations, and medals of Sweden

Notes

References
http://www.mastermason.com/lodge850/Reading/swedishrite.htm
 "The Order of Charles XIII., founded in 1811, is granted to Freemasons of high degree. It is thus quite unique".
English webpage of the Swedish Grand Lodge of Masons
Tom C Bergroth, Kungl. Carl XIII:s Orden 1811 - "til uppmuntran och belöning för medborgerliga och välgörande bemödanden til nödlidandes och allmänt gagn" (2002), 

 
Awards established in 1811
1811 establishments in Sweden